Margrit Conrad (21 September 1918 – 2 August 2005) was a Swiss contralto in opera and concert.

Conrad was born in Lucerne. She studied at the conservatory of Zürich with Ria Ginster. She recorded Bach cantatas with Diethard Hellmann. She died in Baden, aged 86.

References

External links 
 Konzertchronik 1947 – 2014 Zürcher Bach Chor

Contraltos
1918 births
2005 deaths
People from Lucerne
20th-century Swiss women opera singers